The Springfield Public School located in the Strip District neighborhood of Pittsburgh, Pennsylvania, was built in 1872 and closed in 1934. After closing it served as a warehouse. The building was listed on the National Register of Historic Places in 1986.

References

School buildings on the National Register of Historic Places in Pennsylvania
Italianate architecture in Pennsylvania
School buildings completed in 1871
Schools in Pittsburgh
National Register of Historic Places in Pittsburgh
1871 establishments in Pennsylvania